Rémy Baget (born 27 July 1997) is a French rugby union player. He currently plays as a wing for Bayonne in the Top 14.

A former Toulouse academy player, he became professional with Bayonne.

Career
Rémy Baget was called by Fabien Galthié to the French national team for the first time in June 2022, for the summer tour of Japan.

References

External links
 
 All.Rugby

French rugby union players
Rugby union wings
Stade Toulousain players
Aviron Bayonnais players
Sportspeople from Tarn (department)
Living people
1997 births